Lleyton Hewitt defeated Pete Sampras in the final, 7–6(7–4), 6–1, 6–1 to win the men's singles tennis title at the 2001 US Open. It was his first major title.

Marat Safin was the defending champion, but lost in the semifinals to Sampras in a rematch of the previous year's final.

Former two-time champion Pat Rafter made his final major singles appearance, losing in the fourth round to Sampras. This was the first major main draw appearance of future ATP Finals champion David Nalbandian.

The high profile quarterfinal match between Pete Sampras and Andre Agassi was an all-time classic match, and saw both Sampras and Agassi each hold serve in every single one of their 24 service games apiece. The match had no breaks of serve at all, and ended with Sampras winning 6–7(7–9), 7–6(7–2), 7–6(7–2), 7–6(7–5).

This was the first time the US Open used 32 seeds instead of 16, in order to better spread out the higher ranked players.

Seeds
The seeded players are listed below. Lleyton Hewitt is the champion; others show the round in which they were eliminated.

Qualifying

Draw

Finals

Section 1

Section 2

Section 3

Section 4

Section 5

Section 6

Section 7

Section 8

External links
 Association of Tennis Professionals (ATP) – 2001 US Open Men's Singles draw
2001 US Open – Men's draws and results at the International Tennis Federation

2001 US Open (tennis)
US Open (tennis) by year – Men's singles